Luboszyce  is a village in the administrative district of Gmina Łubniany, within Opole County, Opole Voivodeship, in south-western Poland.

The village has an approximate population of 1,000.

References

Villages in Opole County